Carpenteria , the tree anemone or bush anemone, is a genus of flowering plants in the hydrangea family Hydrangeaceae. It is closely related to the similar genus Philadelphus and is monotypic, being represented by the single species Carpenteria californica which is a flowering evergreen shrub native to the Sierra Nevada foothills in California.

The genus was named in honor of Dr. William Marbury Carpenter, a noted botanist from Louisiana.

Description

It flowers from late spring to midsummer. The fruit is a leathery capsule  in diameter, containing numerous seeds.

Distribution and habitat
The bush anemone is a rare species, endemic to only seven sites in Fresno and Madera Counties, where it grows in chaparral and oak woodlands at  altitude, between the San Joaquin River and Kings River. It is well adapted to wildfire, reproducing by stump sprouts after burning. Natural seedlings are rare.

Cultivation
Carpenteria californica is cultivated as an ornamental plant, grown for its lush foliage, large scented flowers and drought tolerance. It is used in traditional and wildlife gardens in subtropical and temperate locations in the northern hemisphere.

It has been in cultivation since 1875, and is now much more common in gardens than in its natural habitat.  It first flowered in England for the famed plantswoman Gertrude Jekyll at Godalming in 1885.

Cultivars include:
'Elizabeth' —  masses of smaller white flowers, more compact growth habit
'Ladham's' — large flowers

The cultivars ‘Elizabeth’ and ‘Bodnant’ have gained the Royal Horticultural Society’s Award of Garden Merit.

References

Hydrangeaceae
Cornales genera
Monotypic asterid genera
Endemic flora of California
Taxa named by John Torrey
Garden plants of North America
Drought-tolerant plants